Stavanger Ishockeyklubb, commonly referred to as Stavanger Oilers, is a Norwegian ice hockey team based in Stavanger, Norway. They currently play in the Fjordkraftligaen, which is the top division in Norwegian ice hockey. As of 2023, it is the only team in the league from western Norway. The Oilers play their home matches in DNB Arena.

History
Stavanger Oilers were established as a company team by Finnish expatriate workers in 2000. Viking Hockey had traditionally been the dominant hockey club in Stavanger. The club's establishment was led by the Finnish businessman Hartti Kristola, who withdrew his economic support from Viking to focus on Oilers.

The club played their first official game in the autumn of 2001, with players from the higher divisions of Finnish hockey, as well as a number of former Norwegian national ice hockey team players. These played alongside amateur local players. Stavanger Oilers, starting at the bottom of the league system, went through the 2001/02 season unbeaten, scoring 304 goals. The club top scorer, Finnish forward Jari Kesti, scored or assisted on 226 of them.

In 2002/03 Oilers went through their first 18 games unbeaten. Ahead of the season, the team received more Finnish players, as well as two of Viking Hockey's players, Tommy Edlund and Thomas Kristensen. The club's first loss came away against Gjøvik Hockey, was followed by another loss the next day to the same team. Oilers also got beaten by local rivals Bergen IK, who were the first team to defeat Oilers in Siddishallen. The team reached first place at the end of the season, with Bergen finishing second. Player Jari Kesti scored 150 points from Oilers 296 goals, and countrymen Tomi Suoniemi and Jarkko Ollikainen both scored more than 100 points. Promotion to the GET-ligaen was secured following five victories in the qualification play-offs, with the only defeat coming against Bergen in a penalty shootout.

Ahead of its first season in the GET-ligaen, more Finnish players and some young Norwegian players joined Oilers. At the start of the season the team beat Lillehammer 5–1 in the opening match, followed by a 10–0 away win at Manglerud Star in the second match. The first defeat came at home against fellow promoters Bergen. At the end of the season, Oilers finished sixth in the table. Again, Jari Kesti was the club top scorer, for the third season in a row. In the playoffs, Oilers beat Trondheim by three games to one in the quarter finals, winning the final game in sudden death in front of a sell-out crowd of 2600 people in Siddishallen. Teemu Kohvakka scored the deciding goal with only 14 seconds left of the first period of sudden death. In the semifinals, Oilers were beaten by Storhamar in three straight games.

The second elite season saw two players leave the club: Jari Kesti signed for Vålerenga and Christian Dahl Andersen went to Swedish side Arboga. Both came back during the same seasons, after unsuccessful stints in their new clubs. Owner Hartti Kristola withdrew his financial backing, and a local business executive, Tore Christensen, took over control of the club. Oilers' performances varied throughout the season, and after a loss against bottom side Bergen, Matti Riekkinen resigned as the team coach. He was replaced by Swede Gunnar Johansson in January 2005. The team finished the season in seventh place, losing against Vålerenga in the play-off quarter-finals.

Ahead of the 2005/06 season, Swedish players Bengt Höglund, Martin Johansson and Fredrik Sundin were brought in, along with the Norwegian national team player Snorre Hallem. The club had its best season to date, finishing in fourth place in the GET-ligaen. In the playoffs, Oilers beat Sparta Warriors by four games to two in the quarter finals. In the semi finals against second-placed Stjernen, each team won their home games until Oilers decided the series through a 2–1 victory in the seventh and final game of the series, away at Stjernehallen. The first-ever play-off final featured a hockey team from Stavanger ended in a defeat in four straight games against Vålerenga.

In the 2006/07 season, players joining included Henric Höglund from Stjernen and Norwegian national team players Marius Trygg and Lars Peder Nagel. At the end of the season, they finished in third place, which was still the club's best result to date. This was the third time that a team from Stavanger had won the bronze medals in the league, with Viking winning the bronze twice in the past. At the end of the season, past players Jari Kesti and Tomi Suoniemi were also honoured, as their respective shirt numbers, #7 and #22, were officially retired by the club. In the playoffs Comet were beaten by four games to two in the quarter finals, while Oilers lost to Storhamar Dragons by the same score-line in the semi finals. The club won the 2013–14 IIHF Continental Cup.

Season-by-season results
This is a partial list of the last five seasons completed by the Oilers. For the full season-by-season history, see List of Stavanger Oilers seasons.

Retired numbers

References

External links

 
Ice hockey teams in Norway
Sport in Stavanger
GET-ligaen teams
2001 establishments in Norway
Ice hockey clubs established in 2001
Kontinental Hockey League expansion teams